The  neurovascular unit (NVU) is a group of closely related cells and extracellular matrix components that function in the homeostatic haemodynamic response of cerebral hyperaemia.

Cerebral hyperaemia is a fundamental central nervous system mechanism  of homeostasis that increases blood supply to neural tissue when necessary. This mechanism controls oxygen and nutrient levels using the methods of vasodilation and vasoconstriction in a multidimensional process involving the many cells of the neurovascular unit. The cells of the NVU sense the neural needs of oxygen and glucose and trigger  the appropriate vasodilatory or vasoconstrictive responses. Thus the NVU plays a vital role of neurovascular coupling of neural activity and cerebral blood flow. Imaging has shown that areas of neural activity in the brain are supplied with an increased blood flow while blood flow to inactive regions is restricted. 

Dysfunction of the NVU has been seen to be  associated with neurodegenerative diseases. However, the mechanisms are not well understood. One factor may be related to astrocyte dysfunction.

Function

Cells of the neurovascular unit include neurons, astrocytes, blood-brain-barrier epithelial cells, myocytes and pericytes. Other components come from the extracellular matrix. The brain has a very high energy need and no storage support which means that it has to take oxygen and glucose from the dynamic blood supply. Imaging has shown that areas of brain activity are supplied with an increased flow of blood. The cells of the NVU sense the needs of neural tissue and release many different mediators that engage in signaling pathways, and effector systems such as the myogenic effect; these mediators  trigger the vascular smooth muscle cells to increase blood flow through vasodilation or to reduce blood flow by vasoconstriction. This is recognized as a multidimensional response that is acknowledged to operate across the cerebrovascular network as a whole.

Clinical significance
The NVU concept with its involvement with neurology was made formal in the NINDS Stroke Progress Review Group in 2001. Dysfunction in the NVU is associated with neurodegenerative diseases including Alzheimer's disease, and Huntington's disease though its mechanism is not well understood. However, it is recognised that maintaining the health of the cerebrovascular system promotes good health for the brain.

References

Neurology